The Threshing Floor (Spanish - La trilla) is an oil sketch by Francisco Goya. He painted it in the 1780s as a small-scale sketch for a tapestry cartoon entitled Summer, part of a set of designs for tapestries for the Royal Palace of El Pardo, specifically the rooms of the Prince of Asturias (the future Charles IV) and his wife Maria Luisa. 

The sketches for the tapestries were presented for royal approval prior to the preparation of the cartoons, but rather than entering the royal collection, La trilla remained in the artist's possession until he sold it and several other works to his patrons the Duke and Duchess of Osuna. They remained in the ducal palace at Alameda de Osuna until their sale to R. Trauman at auction in 1896. They were bought between 1925 and 1927 by the collector José Lázaro Galdiano and remain in the Lázaro Galdiano Museum.

See also
List of works by Francisco Goya

References

External links

1786 paintings
Paintings by Francisco Goya
Paintings in the collection of the Lázaro Galdiano Museum
Tapestry cartoons